Hannes Marino Hannesson (November 27, 1884 – June 11, 1958) was a Member of Parliament for Manitoba and a lawyer.

Born in Iceland, Hannesson's family immigrated to Canada and settled in Winnipeg, Manitoba in 1886 where he was schooled. He attended the University of Manitoba and trained as a lawyer, being called to the Manitoba bar in 1905 and practiced law in Winnipeg and Selkirk, Manitoba.

During World War I, Hannesson joined the Canadian Expeditionary Force and saw action in France. He was promoted to lieutenant in 1916, captain and then major in 1916 and then lieutenant-colonel in 1917.

He entered politics after the war and was elected to the House of Commons of Canada as a Conservative MP for Selkirk defeating Liberal-Progressive MP Leland Payson Bancroft. The election returned a minority parliament and Hannenson was defeated by Bancroft a year later in the 1926 federal election and returned to private life. He died in Victoria, British Columbia in 1958 at the age of 73.

References

External links

Manitoba Historical Society biography

1884 births
Conservative Party of Canada (1867–1942) MPs
Members of the House of Commons of Canada from Manitoba
Canadian Expeditionary Force officers
Canadian people of Icelandic descent
1958 deaths